Callirhoe is a genus of flowering plants in the mallow family, Malvaceae. Its nine species are commonly known as poppy mallows and all are native to the prairies and grasslands of North America. Of the nine species, some are annuals while others are perennial plants.

The genus is named for the Oceanid Callirrhoe in Greek mythology.

Poppy mallow leaves are alternate and palmately lobed. The flowers are cup-shaped and brightly colored.

The purple poppy mallow (Callirhoe involucrata) is grown as a garden plant. It is a low-growing perennial with a large taproot and hairy stems. The flowers range from cerise to reddish violet with white centers. It is especially used in dry climates.

Species include:
 Callirhoe bushii Fernald – Bush's poppy mallow
 Callirhoe digitata Nutt. – fringed poppy mallow, winecup
 Callirhoe involucrata (Torr. & A.Gray) A.Gray – purple poppy mallow, winecup
 Callirhoe leiocarpa R.F.Martin – tall poppy mallow
 Callirhoe papaver (Cav.) A.Gray – woodland poppy mallow
 Callirhoe pedata (Nutt. ex Hook.) A.Gray – palmleaf poppy mallow
 Callirhoe scabriuscula B.L.Rob. – Texas poppy mallow
 Callirhoe triangulata (Leavenw.) A.Gray – clustered poppy mallow

Formerly placed here 
 Sidalcea oregana spicata (Regel) C.L.Hitchc. (as C. spicata Regel)

References

External links 
 HortiPlex info for Callirhoe

 
Malvaceae genera